Ghose is a surname, and may refer to:

 Ajoy Ghose, Indian mining engineer
 Anindya Ghose (born c. 1974), Indian-born American business academic
 Arundhati Ghose (1939–2016), Indian diplomat
 Aurobindo Ghose or Ghosh, known as Sri Aurobindo (1872–1950), Indian philosopher, yogi, guru, poet and nationalist
 Chinmoy Kumar Ghose, known as Sri Chinmoy (1931–2007), Indian spiritual leader 
 Debasish Ghose (born 1960), Indian engineer and academic
 Dilip Ghose (born 1932), Indian cricketer
 Gopal Ghose (1913–1980), Indian painter from West Bengal
Gopal Ghose (1920 - 2015), Veteran Odia Actor, Director, Producer, Writer. 
 Goutam Ghose (born 1950), film director, music director and cinematographer
 Katie Ghose (born 1970), British campaigner and lawyer
 Manmohan Ghose (1869–1924) was an Indian poet writing in English, brother of Sri Aurobindo
 Monomohun Ghose (1844–1896)
 Nilima Ghose (born 1935) female track athlete from India and Olympian
 Parbati Ghose (1933–2018), Indian actress, film director and film producer
 Partha Ghose (born 1939), Indian physicist, author, philosopher and musician
 Pinaki Chandra Ghose (born 1952), judge and Lokpal of India
 Sagarika Ghose (born 1964), Indian journalist, news anchor and author
 Sanjoy Ghose (1959–1997), Indian rural development activist
 Santi Ghose (1916–1989), Indian nationalist assassin
 Saroj Ghose (born 1935), Indian science popularizer and museum founder
 Saumendra Kumar Ghose (born 1964), Mayor of the city of Cuttack, Odisha state, India
 Shohini Ghose, astrophysicist
 Subiman Ghose (born 1906), Indian politician
 Surendra Mohan Ghose, Indian politician
 Zulfikar Ghose (born March 13, 1935), Pakistani novelist, poet and essayist

See also
 Ghosh
ghose (a special type of hose reel used in QLD Australia)